Marymoor Village station is a future Link light rail station near Marymoor Park in Redmond, Washington. The station is located along the south side of State Route 520 southwest of its interchange with State Route 202 near Downtown Redmond. It also includes a 1,400-stall park and ride in a garage built on the site.

The station was originally included in the Sound Transit 2 ballot measure in 2008, but was left out of the East Link Extension after a funding shortfall stemming from the City of Bellevue's desire for a tunneled alignment under Downtown Bellevue. Sound Transit instead completed environmental reviews and selected a preferred alignment to Downtown Redmond, indefinitely deferring the final segment of East Link until a later date. The Sound Transit 3 ballot measure, passed in 2016, includes $1.1 billion in funding for the two stations in Downtown Redmond, which were planned by 2024. Preliminary engineering on the Redmond extension was approved in February 2016, after being suspended in 2010.

The station was originally named SE Redmond until Marymoor Village was adopted as its permanent name in June 2022. It is scheduled to open in 2025.

References

Future Link light rail stations
Link light rail stations in King County, Washington
Buildings and structures in Redmond, Washington
Railway stations scheduled to open in 2025